Louis Jessup Delsarte III (September 1, 1944 – May 2, 2020) was an African-American artist known for what has sometimes been called his "illusionistic" style. He was a painter, muralist, printmaker, and illustrator.

When Delsarte was growing up, he was surrounded by music including jazz, opera, musicals, and the blues. 
From this experience, as well as from his knowledge of African history and culture, he has drawn much of the inspiration for his art.  Delsarte was a professor of Fine Arts at Morehouse College in Atlanta, Georgia. For the past 13 years his work has been exhibited around the United States.

Education, exhibitions, and critical recognition
Louise J. Desarte III was born in Brooklyn, New York, to Louis Desarte II and Llewellyn (Johnston) Delsarte, both educators. Delsarte went to high school in Brooklyn's Flatbush neighborhood, received a certificate in Fine Arts Education from Brooklyn College, earned his bachelor's degree in Fine Arts at New York's Pratt Institute, and obtained a master's degree in Fine Arts at the University of Arizona.

Delsarte's work has been featured in solo and group exhibitions at museums, galleries, and other venues throughout the United States, including the Studio Museum in Harlem, the Metropolitan Museum of Art in New York, the Schomburg Center for Research in Black Culture in New York, the Bodley Gallery (also in New York), the California Afro-American Museum, the Camille Hanks Cosby Museum at Spelman College in Atlanta, Georgia, and the Howard University fine arts gallery.  In 2001, Delsarte's work was included as part of a national traveling exhibition entitled "When the Spirit Moves: African-American Dance in History and Art". The traveling exhibition was sponsored by the Smithsonian Institution, having originated as a 1999-2000 exhibition at Spelman College (entitled "When the Spirit Moves: African American Art Inspired by Dance".

In 2001, Delsarte completed a large public mural commissioned by the city of New York. The monumental work, entitled "Transitions", is located at the Church Avenue station, on the Brooklyn IRT line.

Delsarte received further national recognition in August 2005 when the United States Postal Service issued a stamp featuring a Delsarte painting. The stamp depicts the march from Selma to Montgomery, Alabama, taken from a Delsarte painting created in 2000.

Also in 2005, Delsarte completed another monumental public mural, this one entitled "Spirit of Harlem". The 30 ft X 11 ft glass mosaic was assembled in Munich, Germany, and is located at North Fork Bank on 125th Street in New York City.

In January 2010, Delsarte's 125-foot-long Martin Luther King Jr. Memorial Mural was dedicated at Peace Plaza in Atlanta, Georgia.

Significant critical recognition of Delsarte's contribution to American art has included discussion of his work in Samella Lewis's African American Art & Artists: a history of African American art from the seventeenth-century to the 1990s

His painting "Greenwood Lake", inspired by summers spent at Greenwood Forest Farms, where Langston Hughes also lived for a time,  was made into an oversized 6'6" square panel for inclusion in the Greenwood Lake Mural Project by curator Melanie Gold.  It can be viewed by the general public at 673 Jersey Ave in Greenwood Lake.  The project also includes works by other artists, and was featured in a New York Times article

Style and technique: a synthesis of chaotic abstraction and disciplined figuration
Delsarte's paintings are generally figurative and notable for their complex, layered look, enlivened with rapidly executed strokes in strong colors, as Adrienne Klein notes in an interview with the artist available online at the Union College website. Delsarte describes how he often creates a painting "over 10 to 12 sessions", sometimes laying the canvas on the floor and applying colors from every direction, "without even looking at the drawn image." Next, he allows the paint to dry and then works on the canvas vertically again for another phase of "disciplined drawing" — often going back to the floor for yet more work "when they [the images] have become too literal". Thus, Delsarte's technique reflects a concern for synthesizing the chaotic, unpredictable, irrational aspects of art-making with the tradition of making disciplined, representational images.

Klein draws a connection between these stylistic and technical features, taken together, and the influence of music on the artist's work: "In his paintings, the relationship between the figure and ground – the painted space outside of the figure – shifts and alters. The patterned liveliness of this space draws our eye and suggests the enveloping sound of music. The figures are woven into this vibrant atmosphere."

He died May 2, 2020.

Monographs and solo shows
[Main sources for this list: (1) Worldcat; and (2) African American Visual Artists Database

 Atlanta (GA). Modern Primitive Gallery. LOUIS DELSARTE. 2001. Solo exhibition.
 Brooklyn (NY). Dorsey Gallery. LOUIS DELSARTE: Recent Works. 1993. Solo exhibition.
 Harris, Michael D.. The Spiritual and Mystical World of LOUIS DELSARTE, 1998.
 Los Angeles (CA). California Afro-American Museum. LOUIS DELSARTE: Gallery of Greats. 1991. Solo exhibition.
 Miami (FL). Frances Wolfson Art Center, Miami-Dade Community College. The Art of LOUIS DELSARTE. February 12 - March 13, 1987. Solo exhibition. [Smithsonian Archives of American Art].
 New Orleans (LA). Amistad Research Center. LOUIS DELSARTE. 1999. Solo exhibition.
 New Orleans (LA). Stella Jones Gallery. LOUIS DELSARTE: Reflections. 1998. Solo exhibition.
 New York (NY). Bodley Gallery. LOUIS DELSARTE. 1980.
 New York (NY). Gallery 62, National Urban League. LOUIS DELSARTE: New Visions. February 7-March 11, 1982. Solo exhibition.
 New York (NY). Gallery 62, National Urban League. LOUIS DELSARTE: No Place Like Home. 1991. Solo exhibition.
 New York (NY). NoHo Gallery. LOUIS DELSARTE: Between Heaven and Earth. 1990. Solo exhibition.
 Washington (DC). Curtis Lewis Gallery. LOUIS DELSARTE: Recent Works. 1998. Solo exhibition.
 Wichita (KS). African American Museum. LOUIS DELSARTE. 2005. Solo exhibition.

References

Citations

Books
Alkalimat, Abdul; Elaine Westbrooks. African American history and culture on the Web: a guide to the very best sites (Wilmington, Del.: Scholarly Resources ; London: Eurospan, 2003) ; ; ;)
Childs, Adrienne L.; University of Maryland (College Park, Md.). Art Gallery. Successions : prints by African American artists from the Jean and Robert Steele collection (College Park, MD : Art Gallery, University of Maryland, 2002) ; 
Delsarte, Louis;  Bodley Gallery (New York, N.Y.) Louis Delsarte [solo exhibition catalogue] (New York : Bodley Gallery, 1980) OCLC 55522158
Delsarte, Louis;  Gallery 62. New visions : paintings and drawings by Louis Delsarte, February 7 - March 11, 1983, Gallery 62 (New York, NY : National Urban League, 1983) OCLC 38160393
Delsarte, Louis;  John Riddle;  Eloise E Johnson;  Stella Jones Gallery. Dream variations (New Orleans, La. : Stella Jones Gallery, 2001) OCLC 55673120
Frances Wolfson Art Gallery. "Louis Delsarte : paintings and drawings : February 12, 1987-March 13, 1987 : Frances Wolfson Art Gallery, Mitchell Wolfson New World Center Campus, Miami-Dade Community College" ( Miami : Frances Wolfson Art Gallery, 1987) ; 
Glazer, Fred; illustrated by Louis Delsarte. A dream of music (Mad River Press, 1971) OCLC 3499658
Henderson, Ashyia N. Contemporary Black biography, profiles from the international Black community (Farmington Hill, MI : Gale, 2002) ; 
Jackson, Donna;  Parish Gallery.Fifteen years : Parish Gallery 1991 to 2006 ([Washington, D.C.] : Parish Gallery, 2006) OCLC 81148594
Lewis, Samella S. African American art and artists (Berkeley : University of California Press, 1990)    
Lewis, Samella ; Stella Jones Gallery (New Orleans, La.). Ebony soliloquy : a five year retrospective (1996–2001) (New Orleans : Stella Jones Gallery, 2001) OCLC 52642493
McWorter, Gerald A. The African American Experience in Cyberspace (London ; Sterling, Va. : Pluto Press, 2004) (orig. Pluto Press, 1994) ;  ;  ;  

External links
 Official website

1944 births
2020 deaths
20th-century American painters
American male painters
21st-century American painters
21st-century American male artists
American muralists
American illustrators
Artists from Atlanta
Pratt Institute alumni
University of Arizona alumni
Painters from New York City
20th-century American printmakers
Brooklyn College alumni
Morehouse College faculty
African-American printmakers
20th-century African-American painters
21st-century African-American artists
20th-century American male artists